Noah Malone (born October 13, 2001, in Silver Spring, Maryland) is a Paralympic athlete who sprints for Team USA, competing in category T12.

Achievements
 2019: Gold medal (100m, 200m) and silver medal (400m) at the World Para Athletics Junior Championships in Nottwil, Switzerland.
 2019: Gold medal ( relay) and silver medal (100m) at the Parapan American Games in Lima, Peru.
 2021: Silver medal in the men's 100 metres T12 event at the 2020 Summer Paralympics in Tokyo, Japan.
 2022: T12 world records in the 100m (10.34 s) and 200m (21.10 s) at the 2022 Missouri Valley Conference outdoor track & field championships in Des Moines, Iowa.

References

External links
 
 
 
 

2001 births
Living people
Indiana State Sycamores men's track and field athletes
People from Fishers, Indiana
People from Silver Spring, Maryland
American male sprinters
Paralympic track and field athletes of the United States
Paralympic gold medalists for the United States
Paralympic silver medalists for the United States
Paralympic medalists in athletics (track and field)
Athletes (track and field) at the 2020 Summer Paralympics
Medalists at the 2020 Summer Paralympics
Medalists at the 2019 Parapan American Games